AHH may refer to:

 Aghu language, a Papuan language
 "Ahh", a song by Indonesian boy band SM*SH from their 2011 self-titled debut album
 AllHipHop, a website
 Arthur Hallam (1811–1833), English poet, the subject of Alfred Tennyson's poem In Memoriam A.H.H.
 Cytochrome P450, family 1, member A1
Screaming

See also
 AH-2 (disambiguation)
 AH (disambiguation)